Order No. 270, issued on 16 August 1941, by Joseph Stalin during the Axis invasion of the Soviet Union, ordered Red Army personnel to "fight to the last," virtually banned commanders from surrendering, and set out severe penalties for senior officers and deserters regarded as derelicting their duties. Order 270 is widely regarded as the basis of subsequent, often controversial Soviet policies regarding prisoners of war.

Overview
During the pre-war period, the efficiency and morale of Red Army command staff was low as a result of Stalin's purges. By August 1941, Axis forces had achieved overwhelming successes in their advancement deep into Soviet territory. Their successful blitzkrieg strategy disorganized the Soviet defense system, led to the encirclement of numerous Soviet units, including whole field armies.

Stalin issued the order in his capacity as People's Commissar of Defence. The order was aimed primarily at rapidly raising the effectiveness and morale of officers.

In the preamble, the order gives examples of troops fighting in encirclement, as well as cases of surrender by military command. The first article directed that any commanders or commissars "tearing away their insignia and deserting or surrendering" should be considered malicious deserters. The order required superiors to shoot these deserters on the spot. Their family members were subjected to arrest. Order 270 required encircled soldiers to use every possibility to fight on, and to demand that their commanders fight on and organize resistance to the enemy.

According to the order, anyone attempting to surrender instead of fighting on must be destroyed and their family members deprived of any state welfare and assistance. The order also required division commanders to demote and, if necessary, even to shoot on the spot those commanders who failed to command a battle directly in the battlefield.

Commenting on Order No. 270, Stalin stated: "There are no Soviet prisoners of war, only traitors."

Full text

Headquarters of the Supreme Command, Red Army
Chairman of the State Defence Committee J. STALIN

Deputy Chairman of the State Defence Committee V. MOLOTOV
Marshal S. BUDYONNY
Marshal S. TIMOSHENKO
Marshal B. SHAPOSHNIKOV
General of the Army G. ZHUKOV

See also
 Order No. 227
 German mistreatment of Soviet prisoners of war
 Wikisource:ru:Приказ СВГК СССР № 270 от 16.08.41 (The original text in Russian at Wikisource.)

References

Government documents of the Soviet Union
Eastern Front (World War II)
Joseph Stalin
1941 in the Soviet Union